Mount Carroll Township is one of twelve townships in Carroll County, Illinois, USA.  As of the 2020 census, its population was 1,963 and it contained 1,063 housing units.

Geography

Cities
 Mount Carroll (west three-quarters)

Unincorporated towns
 Burke
 Center Hill
 Hickory Grove
 Wacker
(This list is based on USGS data and may include former settlements.)

Cemeteries
The township contains these three cemeteries: Center Hill, Oak Hill and Wacker.

Major highways
  US Route 52
  Illinois Route 64
  Illinois Route 78

Demographics
As of the 2020 census there were 1,963 people, 947 households, and 553 families residing in the township. The racial makeup of the township was 94.65% White, 0.41% African American, 0.00% Native American, 0.20% Asian, 0.00% Pacific Islander, 0.66% from other races, and 4.08% from two or more races. Hispanic or Latino of any race were 3.06% of the population.

There were 947 households, out of which 31.30% had children under the age of 18 living with them, 41.08% were married couples living together, 11.72% had a female householder with no spouse present, and 41.61% were non-families. 33.40% of all households were made up of individuals, and 15.50% had someone living alone who was 65 years of age or older. The average household size was 2.16 and the average family size was 2.59.

The township's age distribution consisted of 21.0% under the age of 18, 10.7% from 18 to 24, 21.7% from 25 to 44, 25.8% from 45 to 64, and 20.9% who were 65 years of age or older. The median age was 40.4 years. For every 100 females, there were 78.0 males. For every 100 females age 18 and over, there were 85.2 males.

The median income for a household in the township was $55,819, and the median income for a family was $60,250. Males had a median income of $44,327 versus $30,472 for females. The per capita income for the township was $28,802. About 10.5% of families and 11.7% of the population were below the poverty line, including 22.6% of those under age 18 and 3.8% of those age 65 or over.

School districts
 West Carroll Community Unit School District 314

Political districts
 Illinois' 16th congressional district
 State House District 71
 State Senate District 36

Notable residents

Notable people from the rural portion of Mount Carroll Township include First Lady of Illinois Bina Deneen (1868-1950), who was born and raised there.

References
 
 United States Census Bureau 2007 TIGER/Line Shapefiles
 United States National Atlas

External links
 City-Data.com
 Illinois State Archives
 Carroll County official site

Townships in Carroll County, Illinois
Townships in Illinois